Amastigomycota or Eufungi is a clade of fungi. It includes all fungi without flagella or centrioles, and with unstacked Golgi apparatus cisternae. Members of this clade are Dikarya and the traditional paraphyletic assemblage "Zygomycota", now divided into several monophyletic phyla.

Classifications

Cavalier-Smith (1981) 

 Kingdom (or Subkingdom) Eufungi
 Phylum Hemiascomycota
 Phylum Ustomycota
 Phylum Zygomycota
 Phylum Ascomycota
 Phylum Uredomycota
 Phylum Basidiomycota
At the time, the monophyly of Fungi (Eumycota) was not fully certain. Cavalier-Smith considered one scenario where Eufungi could be ancestral or basal to other eukaryotes due to their relatively simply cytology and small genome, though he favoured the hypothesis of fungal monophyly, which is now the consensus.

References 

Fungus taxonomy
Fungi by classification
Mycology